Nicevillea is a monotypic moth genus of the family Erebidae. Its only species, Nicevillea epiplemoides, is found in Myanmar, Thailand, Peninsular Malaysia, Sumatra and Borneo. Both the genus and the species were first described by George Hampson in 1895.

References

Calpinae
Monotypic moth genera